Zürich Letten is a former railway station in the Swiss city of Zürich.

Radical changes to the local railway geography in conjunction with the opening of the Zürich S-Bahn system led to the closure of the station in 1989, but the station building still exists, and the trackbed and viaducts are used as a pedestrian path/cycling route.

The former railway station is adjacent to the Letten Power Station on the Limmat.

History

As built in 1894, the right bank railway was a single track line that departed from Zürich HB (main station) in a westerly direction, before performing a clockwise 270 degrees turn via the Aussersihl Viadukt and a bridge over the River Limmat. It then passed through Letten station and the Letten Tunnel in order to reach Stadelhofen station.

With the opening of the Zürich S-Bahn in 1990, the Letten Tunnel was replaced by the Hirschengraben Tunnel, which took a direct route from new through low-level platforms at Zurich HB under the Limmat to Stadelhofen.

After the new route opened, Letten station was closed and the original railway line and tunnel fell into disuse. During the 1980s and early 1990s, the adjacent Platzspitz and later also the vacated Letten station area became a centre for Zürich's drug scene, until this was driven away by police action in 1995.

The railway line was closed in 1998, and by 2002 the tracks had been removed, and the tunnel was filled in and sealed off. The station building, built in 1893, is under cultural heritage management.

Current use 
The Letten Tunnel has been closed off and filled to prevent collapse. Its northern entrance is still visible.

The former track bed through Letten station, the bridge across the River Limmat, and the part of the Aussersihl Viadukt on the line between Industriequartier and Letten have been converted into a pedestrian and cycle route (the line between Zürich HB and  via  of the Aussersihl Viadukt is still operative). Since 2010, the areas below the arches of the Aussersihl Viadukt house shops and restaurants (Im Viadukt).

The station building is currently used by the publishers of the magazine Transhelvetica, but other future uses for the station building are under discussion, with use as a theatre and/or restaurant proposed.

Gallery

References

External links 

Article on the history of the station and tunnel (in German)

Disused railway stations in Switzerland
Letten
Railway stations in Switzerland opened in 1894